Quaerendo is a quarterly peer-reviewed academic journal devoted to manuscripts and printed books in Europe, with a focus on the Low Countries. It was established in 1971 and covers codicology, palaeography, and various aspects of the history of books from around 1500 until the present. In addition to full articles, each issue contains a section dedicated to the announcement of new discoveries, publications, and recent events. The editor-in-chief is Lisa Kuitert (University of Amsterdam).

External links

Publications established in 1971
History journals
Brill Publishers academic journals
Codicology
Palaeography
History of books
English-language journals
Quarterly journals